Walfredo de los Reyes Sr. is a Cuban percussionist, timbalero, and educator, in the fields of session recording, live performance, and clinics. He is the father of famed percussionists Walfredo Reyes Jr. and Daniel de los Reyes and of actor Kamar de los Reyes. He is often cited as one of the most influential modern timbaleros together with Tito Puente and Willie Bobo.

Career
Born as Walfredo de los Reyes III, his trumpeter father was named Walfredo de los Reyes II, also a well known musician. To distinguish the two during their mutually active career span from the 1940s through the early 1960s, his father was originally published as Walfredo de los Reyes Sr. and he as Walfredo de los Reyes Jr. With the senior's retirement, and the onset of his own son's career, he then became published as the new Walfredo de los Reyes Sr. and his son as Walfredo Reyes Jr. (natively Walfredo de los Reyes Palau IV).

Citing Louie Bellson and Buddy Rich as musical influences, he has performed or recorded with artists including Josephine Baker, Cachao, Elena Burke, La Lupe, Julio Gutiérrez, Quarteto Las D'Aida, Louie Bellson, Paquito Hechavarría, Bobby Darin, Dionne Warwick, Juliet Prowse, and Debbie Reynolds.

Discography

Cuban Jazz (1960, Gema).
San Rafael 500 (2001; featuring Walfredo Reyes Sr., Walfredo Reyes Jr., Kamar de los Reyes, Rafael de los Reyes, Karen Briggs, Pedro Eustache)

Equipment
Walfredo Reyes Sr. carries the following endorsements:
 Regal Tip Nylon cap 7/16" 176NT
 Sabian cymbals

References

External links
 
 
Walfredo Reyes Sr. Interview NAMM Oral History Program

Living people
American performance artists
Cuban jazz percussionists
American percussionists
Year of birth missing (living people)
20th-century American musicians
21st-century American musicians
Cuban percussionists